Samad Samadianpour (12 March 1919 - 23 April 1982) was the Chief of Police of Iran during the reign of Mohammad Reza Shah Pahlavi.

References

1919 births
1982 deaths
Chiefs of Shahrbani
Place of birth missing